Eade is an English surname. Notable people with this surname include:

 Alexandra Eade (born 1998), Australian artistic gymnast
 Allen Eade (born 1960), Australian footballer
 Charles Eade (1903−1964), British newspaper editor
 Cliff Eade (1933–2017), Australian footballer
 David Eade (born 1988), New Zealand rower
 Dominique Eade (born 1958), American jazz musician
 George J. Eade (1921−2018), American general
 James Eade (born 1957), American chess player
 Kenneth Eade (born 1957), American attorney, activist and author
 Murray Eade, New Zealand rugby player and coach
 Peter Eade (1919–1979), English theatrical agent
 Rodney Eade (born 1958), Australian footballer
 Scott Eade (born 1992), New Zealand rugby player
 Wilfred Eade Agar (1882–1951), Anglo-Australian zoologist